Polyommatus baltazardi is a butterfly in the family Lycaenidae. It was described by de Hubert de Lesse in 1963. It is found in the Elburz Mountains.

References

Butterflies described in 1963
Polyommatus
Butterflies of Asia